The Loening PW-2 was a 1920s American single-seat monoplane fighter designed by Grover Loening and built by his Loening Aeronautical Engineering Company.

Development
Based on the earlier two-seat braced-wing monoplane fighter, the M-8, the PW-2 was a single-seat variant for the United States Army Air Corps. It had a fixed tailskid landing gear and was powered by a nose-mounted Wright-Hispano H engine with a tractor propeller. The pilot had an open cockpit. The company built three prototypes designated the PW-2 and a production order for 10 aircraft designated the PW-2A followed. The PW-2As were similar to the PW-2 but had a revised tail unit. After four aircraft had been delivered, one aircraft crashed when the wings separated from the aircraft; the contract was canceled. One of the PW-2As was modified with shorter-span wings and a  Packard 1A-1237 engine as the PW-2B.

Variants
PW-2
Prototype, three built one of which had twin rudders and was not flown and used for static testing.
PW-2A
Production variant with revised tail unit, four built and six cancelled.
PW-2B
PW-2A variant with shorter span wings and a 350hp (261kW) Packard 1A-1237

Operators

United States Army Air Corps

Specifications (PW-2A)

See also

References

Notes

Bibliography

  

1920s United States fighter aircraft
PW-2